John J. Collins (born 1946) is the Holmes Professor of Old Testament Criticism and Interpretation at Yale Divinity School. He is noted for his research in the Hebrew Bible, as well as the apocryphal works of the Second Temple period including the sectarian works found in Dead Sea Scrolls and their relation to Christian origins. Collins has published and edited over 300 scholarly works, and a number of popular level articles and books. Among his best known works are the Between Athens and Jerusalem: Jewish Identity in the Hellenistic Diaspora (New York: Crossroad, 1983); Daniel in the Hermeneia commentary series (Minneapolis: Fortress, 1993); The Scepter and the Star. The Messiahs of the Dead Sea Scrolls and Other Ancient Literature (New York: Doubleday, 1995); and The Bible after Babel: Historical Criticism in a Postmodern Age (Grand Rapids, Eerdmans, 2005).

Collins was born in County Tipperary, Ireland, and attended high school in a boarding school (Rockwell College) run by the Holy Ghost Fathers in Cashel, Tipperary.  After high school he joined the Holy Ghost Fathers and spent nine years with the order. He was educated at University College Dublin (B.A., M.A.) and Harvard University (Ph.D.). He has held academic positions at a number of institutions including the University of Notre Dame (1985–91), Harvard University and the University of Chicago (1991–2000). He served as president of the Chicago Society of Biblical Research (1995–96), of the Catholic Biblical Association of America (1996–97), and of the Society of Biblical Literature (2002), and as regional president for the New England and Eastern Canada region of the Society of Biblical Literature (2008). He has also served as editor in chief of Dead Sea Discoveries,  Supplements to the Journal for the Study of Judaism and the Journal of Biblical Literature. He became the General Editor for the Anchor Yale Bible Series in 2008.

Collins is married to Prof. Adela Yarbro Collins, Buckingham Professor of New Testament Criticism and Interpretation at Yale Divinity School since 2000, with whom he has co-authored King and Messiah as Son of God (Grand Rapids: Eerdmans, 2008).

Selected works
 
 
 
 
 
  Description.

References

External links
 Faculty Page at Yale Divinity School
 The CV of John J. Collins hosted by Yale

Old Testament scholars
Pseudepigraphy
American biblical scholars
Roman Catholic biblical scholars
Yale Divinity School faculty
Harvard University alumni
Harvard University faculty
Alumni of University College Dublin
University of Notre Dame faculty
University of Chicago faculty
Academic journal editors
Living people
People from County Tipperary
1946 births